Exposing the Sickness is the second full-length album from Diva Destruction.

Track listing
"Heathcliff"– 4:51
"Hypocrite"– 4:45
"Black Heart"– 4:02
"The One"– 4:22
"Playing The Liar"– 4:15
"Forgotten"– 4:03
"Tempter"– 5:11
"Valley of the Scars"– 3:42
"You're My Sickness"– 4:56
"The Abuser"– 4:40
"When Trees Would Dance"– 5:02
"Survive"– 4:18
"Stolen Bliss"– 4:49
"Dance Remix of Trees (By Julian Beeston)"-5:40

References

External links
 Diva Destruction Discography Info

2002 albums
Alice In... albums
Diva Destruction albums